The Lieutenant-General of the Ordnance  was a member of the British Board of Ordnance and the deputy of the Master-General of the Ordnance. The office was established in 1545, and the holder was appointed by the crown under letters patent. It was abolished in 1855 when the Board of Ordnance was subsumed into the War Office.

List of Lieutenants-General of the Ordnance
Sir Francis Fleming 1545–1558
William Bromfield 1558–1563
Edward Randolph 1563–1566
Sir William Pelham 1567–1587
Sir Robert Constable 1588–1591
George Carew, 1st Baron Carew 1592–1608
Sir Roger Dallison 1608–1616
Sir Richard Moryson 1616–1625
Sir William Harington 1625–1626
Sir William Heydon 1626–1627
Sir John Heydon 1627–1642
John Pym 1642–1643 (Parliamentarian)
Sir Walter Earle 1644–1648 (Parliamentarian)
Thomas Harrison 1650–1652 (Parliamentarian)
William Legge 1660–1670
David Walter 1670–1679
George Legge 1679–1682
Sir Christopher Musgrave 1682–1687
Sir Henry Tichborne, Bt 1687–1689
Sir Henry Goodricke, Bt 1689–1702
John Granville, 1st Baron Granville 1702–1705
Thomas Erle 1705–1712
John Hill 1712–1714
Thomas Erle 1714–1718
Thomas Micklethwait 1718
Sir Charles Wills 1719–1741
George Wade 1742–1748
Sir John Ligonier 1748–1757
Lord George Sackville 1757–1759
John Manners, Marquess of Granby 1759–1763
George Townshend, 4th Viscount Townshend 1763–1767
Henry Seymour Conway 1767–1772
Jeffrey Amherst, 1st Baron Amherst 1772–1782
William Howe, 5th Viscount Howe 1782–1804
Sir Thomas Trigge 1804–1814
Sir Hildebrand Oakes, Bt 1814–1822
William Carr Beresford, 1st Viscount Beresford 1823–1824
Sir George Murray 1824–1825
Sir William Henry Clinton 1825–1829
Lord Edward Somerset 1829–1830
vacant
Sir Hew Dalrymple Ross 1854–1855

References

Sources
 http://www.history.ac.uk/publications/office/ordnance-lieutenant in the United Kingdom

Senior appointments of the British Army
War Office